Embury D. Osband (June 6, 1832 – October 4, 1866) became the commanding officer of the 3rd United States Colored Cavalry Regiment during the American Civil War. Born in New York, he became a teacher and then started a company that provided books to schools. In 1856, he married and moved to Chicago. When war broke out, he raised a company of the 4th Illinois Cavalry Regiment and became its captain. In 1863, he was appointed colonel of a new regiment composed of former African-American slaves. He led the regiment and later a cavalry brigade in Grierson's 1864–65 Raid. He received the brevet rank of brigadier general for war service. After the war he became a farmer in Mississippi but died in 1866.

See also
List of American Civil War brevet generals (Union)

References

1832 births
1866 deaths
People of Illinois in the American Civil War
Union Army colonels
African-American history of the United States military